Strip games or stripping games are games which have clothing removal as a gameplay element or mechanic. The clothing may be removed to keep score, or as penalty for a loss. Some games are sexualised and the eventual complete loss of clothing is considered part of a usual game in the style of a striptease, whereas others merely presume the loss of clothing as an inconvenience. While games involving stripping have been invented independently of non-stripping games, it is also the case that games not normally involving clothing loss can be adapted into strip games. In such instances, some rulesets are more amenable to adaptation than others.

Notable games

Mahjong 

Many  video games have been published, especially by Japanese software companies.

Murchéh daréh 

"Murcheh dareh che kar konam?" ("There are ants [here], what shall I do?"), or just "Murcheh dareh" (مورچه داره, There Are Ants), is a traditional Iranian dance-based game played by women, although a parody played by men exists ("Zar gazidam").

Poker 

Strip poker is a party game and a variation of the traditional poker where players remove clothing when they lose a round. Any form of poker can be adapted to a strip form; however, it is usually played with simple variants with few betting rounds, like five-card draw.

Strip poker can be played by single-sex groups or by mixed groups in social situations and intended to generate an atmosphere of fun and to lighten the social atmosphere by the removal of clothing. While the game is sometimes employed as a type of foreplay, it is itself usually not considered a sexual interaction due to the fact that it does not require contact and full nudity is involved only at the end of the game or sometimes not at all (depending on rule variants). The game is sometimes integrated with Truth or Dare? rules. Strip poker has been adapted for solo gameplay, such as by use of online or offline video games.

Rules 

The rules of strip poker are flexible and intended to generate an atmosphere of fun in a group of consenting adults.

At the beginning of each turn, each player must remove an article of clothing as an ante. If there are two couples playing there should be four shoes in the pot before the cards are dealt. At the outset, one of the articles of clothing is removed from the game permanently. So the winner will receive three articles of clothing in the ante. 

The opener must bet, and they can be raised, just like ordinary poker. After the draw, the players make another bet, like regular poker. Once an article of clothing is removed, it can not be put back on. The clothing is just used as a stake for betting. Only clothing can be bet. No player may withdraw once the game begins without forfeiting all articles of clothing.

Strategy 

In some rule sets, players who fold before the flop are not required to remove clothing. As such, a player who is uncomfortable removing clothing (or, more commonly, a player who does not want to remove all their clothing first) can simply fold very often or every time before the flop, essentially playing a "tight" pre-flop strategy. Using this strategy, a player could stay clothed for the entire game simply by folding their hands.

Strip poker requires a different overall strategy from poker played with betting chips since the maximum loss on a hand of strip poker is (typically) one item of clothing. In a betting environment, a player who stays in the pot with a weak hand is liable to lose many chips in a single hand. In strip poker, the risk of staying in a hand is significantly limited, so players can play hands with lower probabilities than they would in a cash game. For example, in a cash game, because it occurs only 8% of the time, an inside straight draw might be a poor hand to play, hence the saying "Never draw to an inside straight." In strip poker, when the potential loss is only one item of clothing whether you fold or call, an 8% chance to win the hand is better than the alternative.

Another variant uses some sort of betting token, allowing for normal poker strategies. Once a player runs out of tokens, they can "sell" a piece of clothing for more tokens in order to stay in the game.

History 

While it has been suggested that strip poker originated in New Orleans brothels in the United States around the same time as original poker in the 19th century, the term is only attested since 1916. Strip poker most likely began as a prank among boys, and as late as the 1930s, the current mixed-gender version was called "mixed strip poker" in England to differentiate it from the all-male variety.

Media portrayals of strip poker 

Strip poker games are presented in a number of films, including:
 Welcome to the Cabin
 Kicking the Dog
 American Pie 2
 Friday the 13th
 In Time
The Wanderers

Strip poker based television shows include:
 Tutti Frutti/Colpo Grosso - (Germany/Italy - 1990)
 Räsypokka - (subTV - Finland - 2002)
 Strip! - (RTL II - Germany - 1999)
 Everything Goes - (United States - 1981-1988)
 Strip Poker - (USA - 2000)

Strip poker productions on pay per view or DVD often feature pinup models. Examples include:
 National Lampoon's Strip Poker - 2005
 Strip Poker Invitational - 2005
Both examples featured Playboy models, World Wrestling Entertainment models and other pinup models in a no-limit Texas Hold'em competition. National Lampoon's Strip Poker was filmed at the Hedonism II resort in Negril, Jamaica. Strip Poker Invitational productions were filmed in Las Vegas. Both productions aired on Pay-Per-View in 2005.

Strip poker on music video:
 Music video of "Poker Face" by Lady Gaga - 2009

In 1982, an American computer game company, Artworx, produced a Strip Poker game for the Apple II computer. It has been ported to many other computers since then and is still available today. Many others followed. Strip poker is featured as an Easter Egg in the Windows 8 card suite Card Hero.

Yakyūken 

Popularised by Kinichi Hagimoto (although he later expressed regret) and inspired by contemporary Japanese baseball pep routines — Yakyūken (野球拳) means 'baseball fist' — strip games became a popular fixture of comedy and game shows in the mid-20th century initially in the form of yakyūken, in which several rounds of jyan-ken-pon (rock-paper-scissors) are played and televised, with the loser removing a layer of clothing.

Legality 

Depending on jurisdiction and the particular circumstances of the game, strip games may encounter regulation on the grounds of clothes-wearing (or not wearing) norms, gaming and gambling, and sexual expression. Additionally, verbally coercing someone to play a strip game is often considered a form of sexual harassment.

In 2013, the concept of strip sports betting was launched in the United States by creating live internet broadcasts using models and pornstars who bet on football games and take their clothes off as they lose.

See also 

 Naked party
 Drinking game
 Truth or dare
 Parlor game

References

External links 

 

Poker variants
Card games introduced in 1916

Nude recreation
Party games
Sexuality and society